Bolbocerosoma (sometimes misspelled as Bolbocerasoma) is a genus of earth-boring scarab beetles in the family Bolboceratidae. There are about 13 described species in Bolbocerosoma.

Species
 Bolbocerosoma biplagiatum Dawson and McColloch, 1924
 Bolbocerosoma bruneri Dawson & Mccolloch, 1924
 Bolbocerosoma cartwrighti Howden, 1955
 Bolbocerosoma confusum Brown, 1928
 Bolbocerosoma elongatum Howden, 1955
 Bolbocerosoma farctum (Fabricius, 1775) (fancy dung beetle)
 Bolbocerosoma hamatum Brown, 1929
 Bolbocerosoma lepidissimum Brown, 1928
 Bolbocerosoma mexicanum Howden, 2005
 Bolbocerosoma pusillum Dawson & Mccolloch, 1924
 Bolbocerosoma quadricornum Robinson, 1941
 Bolbocerosoma ritcheri Howden, 1955
 Bolbocerosoma tumefactum (Palisot de Beauvois, 1809)

References

Further reading

 Arnett, R.H. Jr., M. C. Thomas, P. E. Skelley and J. H. Frank. (eds.). (2002). American Beetles, Volume II: Polyphaga: Scarabaeoidea through Curculionoidea. CRC Press LLC, Boca Raton, FL.
 Arnett, Ross H. (2000). American Insects: A Handbook of the Insects of America North of Mexico. CRC Press.
 Richard E. White. (1983). Peterson Field Guides: Beetles. Houghton Mifflin Company.

Bolboceratidae